"Me Estás Tentando" is the first single by Puerto Rican reggaeton duo Wisin & Yandel from their compilation album Wisin & Yandel Presentan: La Mente Maestra, released on October 21, 2008 by Machete Music. A remix of the single was released on February 17, 2009. It features Franco "El Gorila" and Jayko, and a music video was also released in early February. The song was also featured in the 2009 video game Grand Theft Auto: Episodes from Liberty City on the San Juan Sounds radio station.

Charts

Weekly charts

Year-end charts

References

External links

2008 singles
Music videos directed by Jessy Terrero
Wisin & Yandel songs
Songs written by Yandel
Songs written by Wisin
2008 songs
Machete Music singles